

See also 
 Lists of fossiliferous stratigraphic units in Europe

References 
 

 Bulgaria
Geology of Bulgaria
Fossiliferous stratigraphic units